Trapania naeva is a species of sea slug, a dorid nudibranch, a marine gastropod mollusc in the family Goniodorididae.

Distribution
This species was described from Ryukyu, Japan. It is widespread in the Indo-Pacific region with records from the African coast (Tanzania, Kenya) through the Maldives, Indonesia and Western Australia to Fiji.

Description
This goniodorid nudibranch is translucent white, with a pattern of large dark brown or black spots with smooth edges on the body. The gills, papillae, oral tentacles and rhinophores are dark brown or black.

Ecology
Trapania naeva probably feeds on Entoprocta which often grow on sponges and other living substrata.

References

Goniodorididae
Gastropods described in 2008